A referendum on a peace treaty was held in East Germany on 29 June 1954. Voters were asked "Are you for a peace treaty and the withdrawal of occupying troops, or for the European Defence Community, the General Treaty and keeping the occupying troops for 50 years?" The first option was approved by 93.46% of voters.

Results

References

Referendums in East Germany
1954 referendums
1954 in East Germany
June 1954 events in Europe